The 2022 EuroCup Basketball Playoffs began on 19 April with the eighthfinals and ended on 11 May 2022 with the final at the Virtus Segafredo Arena in Bologna, Italy, to decide the champions of the 2021–22 EuroCup Basketball. A total of 16 teams competed in the playoffs.

Times are CEST, as listed by Euroleague Basketball (local times, if different, are in parentheses).

Format 

In the playoffs, teams played against each other in a single-game format. The higher ranked regular season team in each matchup enjoyed home court advantage.

Qualified teams

Bracket

Eighthfinals

Summary 

The eighthfinals were played on 19–20 April 2022.

|}

Matches

Quarterfinals

Summary 

The quarterfinals were played on 26–27 April 2022.

|}

Matches

Semifinals

Summary 

The semifinals were played on 3–4 May 2022.

|}

Matches

Final

Summary 

The final was played on 11 May 2022 at the Virtus Segafredo Arena in Bologna.

|}

Match details

See also 
 2022 EuroLeague Playoffs
 2021–22 EuroCup Basketball

References

External links 
 Official website

Playoffs